Richard Allan "Sluggo" Suggitt (October 30, 1958  June 27, 2017) was a Canadian rugby union footballer and a rugby union coach. Ric was also the head coach of the USA Women's 7's Olympic team and was the head coach at University of Lethbridge.

He had to leave competitive rugby at a young age due to successive shoulder injuries. Then, he began his international coaching career.

Suggitt was the coach of the female Canada national team and the men's national seven-a-side team, when he was appointed to the post of coach of the male Canada national rugby union team, in 2004. Under Suggitt the national team achieved qualification to the 2007 Rugby World Cup by beating the USA Eagles 56–7. The World Cup was not so successful and disappointingly only reached a 12–12 draw with Japan. In March 2008, he was replaced by New Zealand coach Kieran Crowley. Suggitt died on June 27, 2017 at the age of 58.

References

External links
Profile of Ric Suggit

1958 births
2017 deaths
Canada national rugby union team coaches
Canadian rugby union coaches
Canadian rugby union players
Sportspeople from Edmonton